Amelia is a 2009 biographical film about the life of Amelia Earhart. Most of the story is told in flashbacks before ending with Earhart's mysterious disappearance. The film was directed by Mira Nair and based on The Sound of Wings by Mary S. Lovell. The film has received predominantly negative reviews.

Plot
On July 2, 1937, Amelia Earhart (Hilary Swank) and her navigator, Fred Noonan (Christopher Eccleston), are on the last leg of an around-the-world flight. Moving in vignettes from her early years when Earhart was captivated by the sight of an aircraft flying overhead on the Kansas prairie where she grew up, her life over the preceding decade gradually unfolds.

As a young woman, Earhart is recruited by publishing tycoon and eventual husband, George Putnam (Richard Gere) to become the first woman to cross the Atlantic Ocean, albeit as a passenger. Taking command of the flight results in success and she is thrust into the limelight as the most famous woman pilot of her time. Putnam helps Earhart write a book chronicling the flight, much like his earlier triumph with Charles Lindbergh's We. She gradually falls in love with him and they eventually marry, although she enacts a "cruel" pledge as her wedding contract.

Embarrassed that her fame was not earned, Earhart commences to set myriad aviation records, and in 1932, recreates her earlier transatlantic flight, becoming the first female pilot to fly solo across the Atlantic. Throughout a decade of notoriety, Earhart falls into an awkward love affair with pilot and future Federal Aviation administrator Gene Vidal (Ewan McGregor). In a display of romantic jealousy, Putnam quietly tells Amelia that he does not want Vidal in his house. Annoyed by the seemingly endless agenda of celebrity appearances and endorsements, Putnam reminds her it funds her flying.

Earhart returns to her husband on the eve of her last momentous flight, her biggest and most dangerous adventure to date, to fly around the world. Earhart's first attempt ends in a runway crash in Hawaii, due to a collapsed landing gear, and her aircraft requires extensive repairs before the flight can be attempted again. Eventually, she takes the repaired Lockheed Model 10 Electra, sponsored by Purdue University, in a reverse direction, leaving the lengthy trans-Pacific crossing for the end.

Setting out to refuel at tiny Howland Island, radio transmissions between USCGC , a Coast Guard picket ship, and Earhart's aircraft reveal a rising crisis; the Coast Guard radio operators realize they do not have sufficient length to provide a "fix". Itasca has a directional finder with a dead battery, and weak radio communications prevent Earhart and USCGC Itasca from making contact. Running low on fuel, Earhart and Noonan fly on. They disappear. A massive search effort is unsuccessful, but solidifies Earhart as an aviation icon.

Cast

 Hilary Swank as Amelia Earhart
 Richard Gere as George P. Putnam
 Ewan McGregor as Gene Vidal
 Christopher Eccleston as Fred Noonan
 Joe Anderson as Bill Stutz
 William Cuddy as  Gore Vidal
 Mia Wasikowska as Elinor Smith
 Cherry Jones as Eleanor Roosevelt
 Divine Brown as the "Torch singer".
 Ron Smerczak as Interviewer
 Virginia Madsen was cast as Dorothy Binney, Putnam's first wife, but her scenes were cut.

Production
Hilary Swank took on the role of executive producer, working closely with Nair. Filming took place in New York City, Toronto, Parkwood Estate in Oshawa, Nova Scotia, Dunnville, Ontario and Niagara-on-the-Lake, Ontario, as well as various locations in South Africa. Over the weekend of June 22, 2008, Swank was in Wolfville, Nova Scotia for filming at Acadia University. At the time, although Swank was a pilot-in-training, her appearance in the aerial sequences was limited, with three other women pilots contracted for the flying scenes. Nair was concerned about insurance and liability issues, and opted for professional pilots, Jimmy Leeward and Bryan Regan to do the bulk of the flying in the film. Contemporary newsreel footage of Earhart was interspersed throughout the film while a combination of static, real aircraft and CGI effects was utilized for the flying sequences. Numerous period aircraft, automobiles and equipment were obtained to provide authenticity, including the use of two replica aircraft, a Lockheed Vega and Fokker F.VIIb/3m Tri-motor Friendship (with limited ability to run up engines and taxi).
The Lockheed 12A Electra Junior "Hazy Lily" (F-AZLL) used alongside another Electra Junior, filled in for the much rarer Lockheed Electra 10E that Earhart used. Despite the efforts to faithfully replicate the period, numerous historical inaccuracies were evident, as chronicled in some reviews.

The aerobatic flying maneuvers in the film were handled by Canadian musician-turned pilot, Larry Ernewein.

At the completion of filming, the two replica aircraft featured in the Earhart transatlantic flights were donated to museums. The Lockheed Vega is now in the collection of the San Diego Air & Space Museum while the Fokker F. VIIB/3M tri-motor is now housed at the Canadian Bushplane Heritage Centre in Sault Ste. Marie, Ontario where it was unveiled in 2009 with a local Amelia Earhart reenactor Kathie Brosemer recounting the story of Earhart's flight in 1928.

Writing
Oscar-winning screenwriter Ronald Bass wrote seven drafts of the script for aviation buff and Gateway founder Ted Waitt, who has funded expeditions to search for Earhart's aircraft, and was prepared to finance the film himself. Bass used research from books on Earhart, such as Susan Butler's East to the Dawn and Mary S. Lovell's  The Sound of the Wings, as well as Elgen and Mary Long's Amelia Earhart: The Mystery Solved. Although the film was not intended to be a documentary, Bass incorporated many of Earhart's actual words into key scenes. Oscar-nominated screenwriter Anna Hamilton Phelan did a rewrite, taking a different approach from the original screenplay.

Reception

Critical response
Amelia received largely negative reviews from film critics, holding a 20% approval rating on Rotten Tomatoes based on 164 reviews, along with an average score of 4.42/10. The website's critical consensus reads: "Amelia takes the compelling raw materials of its subject's life and does little with them, conventionally ticking off Earhart's accomplishments without exploring the soul of the woman." Another review aggregator, Metacritic, which assigns rating of 100 reviews from mainstream critics, gave the film a score of 37 based on 34 reviews.

Echoing the majority view, Martin Morrow's review on the Canadian Broadcasting Corporation website was very critical of the film, labeling it "a dud," declaring: "Hilary Swank may look the spitting image of Earhart in those vintage newsreels, but her performance is more insipid than inspiring. Mira Nair directs as if she were piloting an overloaded plane on an endless runway – the film lumbers along interminably, never achieving takeoff ... As the film limps to a close, Amelia has accomplished a feat we didn't think possible: it has made us indifferent to this real-life heroine's tragic fate." Most critics decried the inconsistencies and lack of focus in the film; Manohla Dargis of The New York Times wrote: "The actors don't make a persuasive fit, despite all their long stares and infernal smiling. ...the movie is a more effective testament to the triumphs of American dentistry than to Earhart or aviation." Ric Gillespie, author of Finding Amelia, wrote: "Swank, under Nair's direction, accomplishes the amazing feat of making one of the most complex, passionate, ferociously ambitious, and successful women of the 20th century seem shallow, weepy, and rather dull."

A small number of positive reviews included Ray Bennett of The Hollywood Reporter who characterized the film as an "instant bio classic," stressing the production values in which "director Nair and star Swank make her quest not only understandable but truly impressive." Matthew Sorrento of Film Threat gave the film 4 stars, and wrote: "Director Mira Nair trusts her old school filmmaking style enough to inspire a fresh take on a legend." Roger Ebert of the Chicago Sun-Times gave the film a positive review and gave it 3 stars out of 4, and called it "a perfectly sound biopic, well directed and acted". In pre-release publicity, Hilary Swank had been touted as a candidate for a third Oscar, but later that prospect was viewed as distant. Carrie Rickey of The Philadelphia Inquirer, however, awarded the film 3 stars, praising Swank's performance in her review stating that: "like Maggie in Million Dollar Baby, [Swank] is unwavering in her gaze, ambition, and drive," and "in Nair's evocatively art-directed (and sensationally costumed) film, Earhart comes alive."

Home media release
On February 2, 2010, Fox Home Entertainment released Amelia in DVD and Blu-ray versions. Extras on the DVD include deleted scenes and "The Power of Amelia Earhart", "Making Amelia" and "Movietone News" featurettes. The Blu-ray release also has two additional featurettes: "The Plane Behind the Legend" and "Re-constructing the Planes of Amelia" along with a digital copy of the film.

References

Citations

Bibliography

 Butler, Susan. East to the Dawn: The Life of Amelia Earhart. Reading, Massachusetts: Addison-Wesley, 1997. .
 Coles, Joanna. " Hilary Swank is Ready for Takeoff." Marie Claire, November 2009.
 Goldstein, Donald M. and Katherine V. Dillon. Amelia: The Centennial Biography of an Aviation Pioneer. Washington, D.C.: Brassey's, 1997. .
 Long, Elgen M. and Marie K. Amelia Earhart: The Mystery Solved. New York: Simon & Schuster, 1999. .
 Lovell, Mary S. The Sound of Wings. New York: St. Martin's Press, 1989. .
 O'Leary, Michael, ed. "Amelia on the Silver Screen."  Air Classics, Volume 45, No. 11, November 2009.
 Rich, Doris L. Amelia Earhart: A Biography. Washington, DC: Smithsonian Institution Press, 1989. .
 Zohn, Patricia. "Oh So Swank." Town and Country, October 2009.

External links
 
 
 

Canadian aviation films
2009 films
2009 biographical drama films
American biographical drama films
Films based on multiple works
2000s English-language films
Fox Searchlight Pictures films
Dune Entertainment films
Films directed by Mira Nair
Films shot in Hamilton, Ontario
Films shot in Nova Scotia
Films set in Oceania
Films set in the 1920s
Films set in the 1930s
Films shot in Cologne
Films with screenplays by Ronald Bass
Canadian biographical drama films
American aviation films
Cultural depictions of Amelia Earhart
English-language Canadian films
Mirabai Films films
2009 drama films
Biographical films about aviators
Films set in Papua New Guinea
2000s American films
2000s Canadian films